Chhagan Bhujbal (born 15 October 1947) is an Indian politician from Maharashtra. Currently he is  Member of 14th Legislative Assembly of Maharashtra from Yeola Assembly. He also served as the Deputy Chief Minister of Maharashtra from 18 October 1999 – 23 December 2003. He earlier also served as Minister of Public Works Department and Minister of Home Affairs in Government of Maharashtra.

Political career
Bhujbal is an OBC leader.
He started his political career from Shiv Sena in the 1960s. Before entering politics, Bhujbal was a vegetable vendor in Byculla Market where his mother had a small fruit shop. He was being influenced by Shiv Sena philosophy and more particularly, by Balasaheb Thackeray, Bhujbal evolved into a hardcore Shiv Sainik. He was amongst initial members of Shiv Sena.

Bhujbal started his political career with the Shiv Sena party. He left the party in 1991 and joined the Indian National Congress. Later, after the Indian National Congress leader Sharad Pawar decided to split from the Congress and form his own party, the Nationalist Congress Party, Bhujbal went along with him.

During his work as Corporator, Bhujbal maintained consistent contact, communication with rank and file of his constituency and its neighbourhood.  Later he was elected as Mayor of Mumbai twice.

He was among the earliest MLAs of Shiv Sena elected from Mazgaon first in 1985 & again in 1990.

Bhujbal contested 2014 General Elections from Nashik Constituency and lost the race to Hemant Godse from Shiv Sena.

Bhujbal is currently Member of Legislative Assembly from Yeola Constituency and is incumbent since 2004.

Enforcement Directorate proceedings 
In December 2017, Enforcement Directorate attached assets worth 20.41 crore rupees belonging to the Bhujbal family under the Prevention of Money Laundering Act.

Criticism

Allegations of deteriorating law & order situation in Nashik
Nashik known to be a peaceful district, where law & order situation has collapsed under Bhujbals' political clout. It is witnessing recession in all sectors. Daylight robberies, armed attacks, chain-snatchings and setting of two- and four-wheelers on fire have become routine.

In view of the criticism of the home department, chief minister Prithviraj Chavan sent police commissioner Vinod Lokhande on leave for his dismal performance, while Samir Bhujbal demanded a CID probe into the collapse of law and order. But a senior Indian Police Service (IPS) official said that when each and every police official has been appointed on the family's recommendations, why should the home department be blamed? Chhagan Bhujbal must accept responsibility and initiate measures to restore the people's confidence.

Alleged misuse and mismanagement of trust property
In 2012, Mumbai Educational Trust (MET) filed a criminal complaint against Chhagan Bhujbal, alleging misuse and mismanagement of trust property for family-run furniture business and destruction of evidence in connection.

Attack on Alpha Marathi 
On 23 Dec 2003, Chhagan Bhujbal resigned from the post of Deputy Chief Minister of Maharashtra, owning the moral responsibility of attack on Alpha Marathi office in Andheri, Mumbai. A group of workers belonging to the Nationalist Congress Party (NCP) attacked the office of Alpha Marathi, which belongs to the Zee group. They were upset with the channel for airing a satire on Bhujbal's alleged role in the multi-crore fake stamp paper scam. NCP president Sharad Pawar told the media on Tuesday night that Bhujbal had sought his permission to resign on moral grounds. Chhagan Bhujbal handed over his resignation to then Chief Minister of Maharashtra Sushilkumar Shinde.

References

1947 births
Living people
Mayors of Mumbai
Deputy Chief Ministers of Maharashtra
People from Nashik
Marathi politicians
Nationalist Congress Party politicians from Maharashtra
Shiv Sena politicians
Indian National Congress politicians
Maharashtra MLAs 1985–1990
Maharashtra MLAs 1990–1995
State cabinet ministers of Maharashtra
United Progressive Alliance candidates in the 2014 Indian general election
Leaders of the Opposition in the Maharashtra Legislative Council
Maharashtra MLAs 2014–2019
Corruption in Maharashtra
Indian prisoners and detainees
People charged with corruption